David Leonard Congdon (born 16 October 1949) is a former British Conservative Party politician. He was the member of parliament (MP) for Croydon North East, South London from 1992 to 1997.

Political career 
Congdon had served as a councillor for many years and served as Deputy Leader of Croydon Council. He was first elected to the House of Commons at the 1992 general selection, succeeding the outgoing speaker Bernard Weatherill who was retiring from the Commons.

The Croydon seats were reorganised ahead of the 1997 general election, with the loss of one seat. Congdon competed against Sir Paul Beresford, then-MP for Croydon Central, for the Conservative Party nomination for the new merged seat and won.  He then lost in the ensuing election in 1997 to Labour's Geraint Davies. Sir Paul Beresford, meanwhile, successfully contested Mole Valley and continued as an MP.

Congdon stood once again against Geraint Davies at the 2001 general election and lost. He then worked for MENCAP, and did not stand again at the 2005 election, when the Conservative candidate Andrew Pelling recaptured the seat from Davies.

Personal life 
Congdon is now retired and lives, with his wife Theresa, in Old Coulsdon. He has one daughter Rebecca and two grandchildren.

References

External links 
 

1949 births
Living people
Conservative Party (UK) MPs for English constituencies
Councillors in the London Borough of Croydon
British charity and campaign group workers
UK MPs 1992–1997